Howard Grant (born June 22, 1966 in Saint Ann, Jamaica) is a retired male Canadian boxer, competing in the light-welterweight (– 63.5 kg) division. A resident of Montréal, Quebec, he represented Canada at the 1988 Summer Olympics in Seoul, South Korea, where he was defeated in the round of 16 by Sweden's Lars Myrberg.

Grant won the gold medal in the same weight division, two years earlier, at the 1986 Commonwealth Games  Howard is renowned for training top UFC Fighters and Professional Boxers.  He and his brother Otis have their own gym on the West Island in Montreal, Grant Brothers Boxing, where they train professional athletes and many amateurs.

Not only coaching, Howard is involved in developing boxing product with several brands such as Grant Boxing and GBB.

Howard has trained former UFC welterweight champion Georges St-Pierre in boxing for a few years now.

Amateur career 
Howard Grant's journey into boxing started in 1979 in Montreal.  Progressing slowly, Howard caught the eye of Pierre Gauthier from the Saint Laurent Boxing Club.  As Howard fine tuned his style over the months, and leading into his path into amateur boxing, Howard was eventually coached by Russ Anber leading into his first amateur boxing tournaments.

As a Junior at 15 years old, Howard Grant captured the gold medal in the Bantamweight division at a Tournament in Vancouver, British Columbia in 1981.

One year later, he captured the gold medal in the Featherweight division at a Tournament in Montreal, Quebec in 1982.

1983 Canada Games: 
Representing Quebec, Howard Grant defeated Ontario's James Hope to capture the gold medal in the 1983 Canada Games in Saguenay-Lac-St-Jean in the Lightweight division.

1983 World Juniors in Dominican Republic: 
Captured the bronze medal in the Lightweight Division.  He lost to the eventual gold medalist, Angel Esponosa, in the semi finals.  Howard Grant considers Angel Esponosa as one of his toughest opponents.

1984 Canadian Nationals in Nova Scotia 
Captured the gold medal in the Lightweight Division.

1984-1986 
From 84-86 Howard Grant participated in many European tournaments representing Canada including the Stockholm Boxing Open in Sweden and the Tammer Tournament in Finland – capturing the silver medal in both tournaments.

1986 World Amateur Boxing Championships 
Captured the silver medal in the 1986 World Amateur Boxing Championships in Reno, Nevada.  Howard was defeated by Vasily Shisov.

1986 Commonwealth Games 
In his biggest tournament victory in his young career, Howard Grant defeated David Clencie by point decision to capture Gold for Canada in the Light-Welterweight Division.  Along with Howard Grant, other notable boxers that participated in this tournament were former Undisputed Heavyweight Champion, Lennox Lewis, who also captured Gold in his division.

1987 International Tournament in Albena, Bulgaria: 
Captured the gold medal in Light welterweight division during the 1987 International Tournament in Albena, Bulgaria

1987 President's Cup in Indonesia 
Captured the President's Cup in the Light-welterweight division

1988 Summer Olympic Games in Seoul, South Korea: 
After defeating Andreas Otto of East Germany in his first bout, Howard was defeated in the Round of 16 by the eventual bronze medal winner, Lars Myrberg of Sweden by split decision.

 Round of 64: bye
 Round of 32: defeated Andreas Otto (East Germany) referee stopped contest in the first round
 Round of 16: lost to Lars Myberg (Sweden) by decision, 1-4

Professional career 
After concluding the amateur portion of his career, Howard Grant turned pro after the 1988 Seoul Olympic Games winning his first 6 professional boxing bouts and going undefeated in his first 17 fights.  Howard compiled a professional record of 16-2-1.  Howard's most notable opponents at the professional level included champions Stevie Johnston, Jake Rodriguez and Billy Schwer.

Professional Fights (16-2-1)

Post-Boxing Career 
Howard Grant's love of the sport never wavered once his in-ring career came to a close.  Howard has spent his post-professional career training the next crop of in-ring gladiators.

Howard Grant along with his Brother, former WBO Middleweight Champion, Otis “Magic” Grant started the Grant Brothers Boxing Gym in 2003.  With his experience and skill, Howard has trained many notable pugilists over the years including his brother Otis, former Canadian Champion, Tony Pep, former IBF super-middleweight champion, Lucien Bute, 1998 Commonwealth games silver medalist, Herman Ngoudjo, former WBA light middleweight world champion, Joachim Alcine, current NABA super bantamweight champion, Olivier Lontchi, former Olympian, Dale Brown, former super middleweight contender, Librado Andrade, former World Boxing Organisation NABO Middleweight Champion, Francis Lafreniere, former Canadian middleweight title holder and IBF International middleweight title contender, Walid Smichet, former World Boxing Council World Super Lightweight champion, Leonard Dorin.

Howard has also trained many accomplished mixed martial artists including future UFC Hall of Famer and decorated champion, Georges St. Pierre, current Bellator Welterweight World Champion, Rory MacDonald, former top UFC middleweight contender, Patrick Côté, former TKO Middleweight Champion, David L’Oiseau, former UFC fighter, Mike Ricci, current UFC Lightweight competitor, Irish Joe Duffy, former UFC contender, Zack Makovsky, former UFC fighter and current TKO competitor, Xavier Alaoui, former UFC and current Bellator top contender, Valerie Letourneau, current TKO competitor, Jamie Mancini, and up-and-coming female MMA fighter and current TKO competitor, Corinne Laframboise.

External links
 Canadian Olympic Committee
 

1966 births
Living people
Light-welterweight boxers
Boxers at the 1988 Summer Olympics
Olympic boxers of Canada
Boxers from Montreal
Anglophone Quebec people
Jamaican emigrants to Canada
Boxers at the 1986 Commonwealth Games
Commonwealth Games gold medallists for Canada
People from Saint Ann Parish
Black Canadian boxers
Canadian male boxers
AIBA World Boxing Championships medalists
Commonwealth Games medallists in boxing
Medallists at the 1986 Commonwealth Games